ETG Research is a polling firm that tracks Indian elections and publishes their findings. The firm has worked in Bihar, West Bengal, Goa, Punjab, Uttarakhand and Uttar Pradesh Assembly Elections.

References

Polling companies
Companies with year of establishment missing